Grevillea hilliana, commonly known as white silky oak, white yiel yiel, Hill's silky oak and grey oak, is a species of flowering plant in the family Proteaceae and is endemic to eastern Australia. It is a tree with lance-shaped to oblong or lobed adult leaves and cylindrical clusters of large numbers of white to pale green flowers.

Description

Taxonomy
Grevillea hilliana was first formally described in 1857 by Ferdinand von Mueller in the Transactions of the Philosophical Institute of Victoria from specimens collected in "forests at the Pine River of Moreton Bay" by Mueller and Walter Hill. The specific epithet (hilliana) honours Walter Hill.

Distribution and habitat

Conservation status
This grevillea is listed as of "least concern" in Queensland but as "endangered" under the New South Wales Government Biodiversity Conservation Act 2016.

References

hilliana
Trees of Australia
Flora of New South Wales
Flora of Queensland
Proteales of Australia
Taxa named by Ferdinand von Mueller
Plants described in 1857